The Copa da Republica de Ciclismo is a single day road cycling race held in Brazil. It exists as both a men's and a women's competition. The women's race, however, did not occur in the first and fifth editions. The first edition of the race was held in 2002 at the Aterro do Flamengo in Rio de Janeiro. From the second edition (held in 2003) to the fifth (held in January 2007), the race took place at the Monumental Axis of Brasília. The sixth edition took place on the streets of Belo Horizonte in December 2007. The seventh edition returned to Aterro do Flamengo in Rio de Janeiro.

Past winners

References
 Results
 2003 Results
 2004 Results
 2005 Results
 2006 Results
 2007 Results

Cycle races in Brazil
Recurring sporting events established in 2002
Men's road bicycle races
Women's road bicycle races
2002 establishments in Brazil